Schemes in Antiques is a 2021 Chinese adventure, suspense film based on Ma Boyong's novel title, Antique Bureau Central Bureau, directed by Derek Kwok and produced by Han Sanping. Starring Lei Jiayin, Li Xian, Xin Zhilei and Ge You. The movie tells of a dispute in the cultural relics circle caused by the return of a Buddha head by the Japanese Kido family.

The film has been released in China on November 28, 2021, and later in Hong Kong on April 21, 2022 by Emperor Motion Pictures, it has postponed due to Hong Kong theatre closure of COVID-19 omicron variant pandemic.

Plot
Miss Kido from Japan (Matsumoto Lili) is about to return a Buddha head of Wu Zetian Mingtang in the Tang Dynasty to China, but she indicated that the descendants of Xu Family, the white character door of the "Five Vessels", an authoritative organization of the cultural relics industry, would come to receive it. And the descendants of Xu's family wish (Lei Jiayin), although they have a talent for ancient times, they have no ambitions. The appearance of the Buddha's head disrupted his life. The entrustment of the granddaughter Huang Yanyan (Xin Zhilei), the head of Wumai, the bizarre death of his father, the persecution of Wumai genius medicine (Li Xian), and the grandfather's death (Ge You)'s follow-up and the pursuit of the mysterious man Lao Zhaofeng (Qin Yan), the wish must be entangled by the forces of all parties to find out the truth of the Buddha's head.

Cast
 Lei Jiayin as Xu yuan		
 Li Xian as Yao Buran
 Xin Zhilei as Huangyan Yan
 Ge You as Fu Gui		
 Qin Yan as Lao Zhaofeng	
 Qingxiang Wang as Huang Kewu			
 Yong Mei as Shen Ye
 Tao Guo as Xu Heping
 Rock Ji as Scarface	
 Alan Aruna as Zheng Guoqu

Production
The film was established in 2018 and produced by the Emperor Films. Lei Jiayin, Li Xian, Xin Zhilei and Ge You joined together for the first time at the first filming in September. The shooting process wrapped up in December 2019.
On November 28th, the film held its premiere in Beijing where director Guo Zijian, the original author and literary consultant Ma Boyong, producer Han Sanping, screenwriter Zhu Xuan, Fan Wenwen, Huang Hai, producer Liang Lin and actors Lei Jiayin, Xin Zhilei, Ge You, Aruna, etc. were present to share the behind the scenes of the film.

Release
In China, Schemes in Antiques was scheduled to premiere on 30 April 2021, but the release was postponed.

Box office
The pre-sale as of 30 November 2021 is 230.000 rmb or $36,501, with total gross worldwide $51,637,422

References

External links
 
 

2021 films
2020s Mandarin-language films
Chinese adventure films
Films shot in Beijing
Films set in Beijing
2021 adventure films